Creggs is a small village and townland in County Galway, Ireland. It is on the border with County Roscommon, on the R362 regional road between Glenamaddy and Roscommon town.

With a population of approximately one hundred people, the village now contains two public houses (although it used to contain seven). The village of Creggs was also once the location of a monthly fair, dancing, football and Feiseanna (music competitions). 

The village has a rugby union team. The rugby grounds is known as the Green. The club has four playing pitches including the only full size 4G artificial pitch in Connacht. The rugby club also has a circa one kilometre community amenity walkway around its grounds.

A memorial in the village at the entrance to the rugby club commemorates the last speech by Charles Stewart Parnell, which was made here approximately two weeks before his death. The memorial was erected by Éamon de Valera in 1946, on the centenary of Parnell's birth.

See also
 List of towns and villages in Ireland

References

Towns and villages in County Galway
Townlands of County Galway